The eleventh Inter-Cities Fairs Cup was played over the 1968–1969 season. The competition was won by Newcastle United over two legs in the final against Újpest FC. It was the second consecutive time that a Hungarian side finished runners-up in the competition, and the first time Newcastle United had competed in a European competition. It is also Newcastle United's most recent trophy.

First round

|}

First leg

Second leg

Dundalk won 3–2 on aggregate.

Juventus won 4–0 on aggregate.

Fiorentina won 3–2 on aggregate.

OFK Beograd won 7–4 on aggregate.

Bologna won 6–2 on aggregate.

Argeș Pitești 1–1 Leixões on aggregate. Argeș Pitești won on away goals rule.

Hamburger SV won 7–3 on aggregate.

Napoli won 3–2 on aggregate.

 Real Zaragoza 3–3 Botev Plovdiv on aggregate. Real Zaragoza won on away goals rule.

Second round

|}

First leg

Second leg

Rangers won 9–1 on aggregate.

Eintracht Frankfurt won 1–0 on aggregate.

Fiorentina 4–4 Hansa Rostock on aggregate. Fiorentina won on away goals rule.

OFK Beograd won 2–1 on aggregate.

Göztepe won 5–3 on aggregate.

Napoli 2–2 Leeds United on aggregate. Leeds United won on a coin toss.

Third round

|}

First leg

Second leg

Vitória de Setúbal won 4–2 on aggregate.

Quarter-finals

|}

Semi-finals 

|}

First leg

Second leg

Newcastle United won 2–0 on aggregate.

Újpest FC won 8–1 on aggregate.

Final 

|}

External links 
 Inter-Cities Fairs Cup results at Rec.Sport.Soccer Statistics Foundation
 Inter-Cities Fairs Cup Seasons 1968-69 – results, protocols
 website eurocups-uefa.ru Fairs' Cup Seasons 1968-69 – results, protocols
 website Football Archive 1968–69 Fairs' Cup

2
Inter-Cities Fairs Cup seasons